Tomb TT191, located in the necropolis of El-Assasif in Thebes, Egypt, is the tomb of Wahibre-Nebpehti, who was the chamberlain of the Divine Adoratrice of Amun and the director of the festival from the time of Psamtik I.

Wahibre-Nebpehti's tomb is part of the TT192 tomb complex. Wahibre-nebpehti was the son of Pedehor (a head of the outline draughtsmen) and Thesmutpert. Wahibre-nebpehti had a son who was named Pedehor after his grandfather. The son was also a chamberlain of the Divine Adoratrice.

See also
 List of Theban tombs

References

Theban tombs